Upbeat is a syndicated musical variety show produced in Cleveland, Ohio  at ABC affiliate WEWS-TV 5 that aired from 1964 to 1971 (the last five years airing nationally in first run syndication).

History
Originally titled as The Big 5 Show, the series began as a local program when it premiered in 1964, the name was a reference to WEWS Channel 5 and the 5 to 6 p.m. time slot on Saturday afternoons. When the program became syndicated nationally, the name of the show was changed to Upbeat, and as stations had the option of airing the program at different times, the program's title change was necessary.

The introduction of the program commenced with a studio musician shouting "hey let's go with the Upbeat show!" as the in-house band, Dave C and the Sharptones, would play the introductory theme song with the program's main title logo, slowly exploding and coming back together again in a quasi-animated frame by frame fashion as the performers were announced for that particular episode.  The series was aired in black and white from 1964 until 1967, then broadcast in color from 1967 until the series demise in 1971.

The program's host, Don Webster, was a familiar face to WEWS viewers. In addition to hosting "Upbeat," Webster was also WEWS' weatherman on their nightly newscasts.

Upbeat was inducted into the inaugural class of the Rhythm and Blues Music Hall of Fame in August 2013.

Local and area performers
In addition to such local talent as The People's Choice, Ivan and the Sabers, Rapid Transit, the GTOs, the Grasshoppers, the Baskerville Hounds, Bocky and the Visions, the Damnation of Adam Blessing, the James Gang and Raspberries founder Eric Carmen, many regional performers gaining national exposure also appeared on the show including Question Mark & the Mysterians, Terry Knight and the Pack, Mitch Ryder and the Detroit Wheels, the Chylds, the Bob Seger System, Cleveland's the Outsiders and Canton's O'Jays .

The Upbeat dancers
During years when "Go-Go" was popular, the show featured its own go-go girls made up of area young ladies dressed in the popular outfits and footwear of that period.

Some of the original dancers included: Jeff Kutash, Sue Dubbs, Danny Butler, Judy Kaye, Joan Kuchta, Sandy Salamone, Ginna Sloane, Dr. John Grove, Kathy Watson, Sandy Ashmun, Barbara Chapman, Linda Wike, Lynne Krause, John Harrison and Dave Carter.

Prior to 1966, Upbeat was televised locally. By 1968 it was nationally syndicated in over 100 cities.  The dancers during that period (1968–71) included: Joanne Zelasko, Jean Hagadorn, Arlee Gibson, Arline Burks, Linda Wike, Beverly Jones, Constance Gibson, Diane Rini, Jacquelyn Carson, Diane Friedl, John Magill, Kim Havrilla, Kathee Stiber, Jimmy Stallard,  Linda Mulcahey, Mary Lynn Curnayn, Michael Ray, Patty Rutti and Peggy Miller.

Saturday's Crowd performing "Do I Still Figure In Your Life"
? and the Mysterians
James Brown
Jackie Wilson
The 5th Dimension
The Box Tops
The Who
Stevie Wonder
John Denver
Jimmy Buffett
Raven
The Fifth Estate (band)
The First Edition
B.B. King
The Miracles
Steve Britt
Steppenwolf
The Impressions
Bobby Sherman
Love
The Left Banke
The Incredible Fog
The Lemon Pipers
The Vogues
The Volcanics
The Monkees
The Easybeats (performing "Friday On My Mind" and "Heaven And Hell")
Otis Redding with the Bar-Kays (Appeared on December 9, 1967; Redding and four members of the Bar-Kays died in a plane crash the next day)
The Yardbirds
Dave Dee, Dozy, Beaky, Mick & Tich
The O'Jays
The Barbarians
Blue Cheer
Jefferson Airplane
Ronnie Dove
Little Anthony and the Imperials
Inez & Charlie Foxx
Lesley Gore
Frankie Valli and the Four Seasons
Jerry Lee Lewis

Paul Revere and the Raiders
The Shadows of Knight
The Music Explosion
Richard and the Young Lions – two appearances
The Shangri-Las
The Velvet Underground (1969) This is believed to have been the band's only national TV appearance.
Jerry Butler
Jack Blanchard & Misty Morgan
Funkadelic
Keith and the Wild Kingdom
Wilmer and the Dukes
Chubby Checker
The Mob
The Outsiders
The Ides of March
The Buckinghams
The New Colony Six
The Mauds
The Cryan' Shames
The American Breed
The Epic Splendor
The Epitome Of Sound
The Gurus
The Blue Jays
The Blue Jays - originated in Providence, RI
Blood, Sweat & Tears
Spanky and Our Gang

See also
Upbeat (music)

References

External links
"Retro Radio" with Joe Madigan a WIXY-1260 tribute show on WJCU-FM.(nod to "Upbeat" show)
Cleveland Classic Media: "WEWS-TV behind the scenes, 1966–67", February 18, 2011. Includes some material from "Upbeat".

1960s American music television series
1970s American music television series
1960s American variety television series
1970s American variety television series
1964 American television series debuts
1971 American television series endings
Black-and-white American television shows
Dance television shows
First-run syndicated television programs in the United States
Pop music television series
Television in Cleveland